Norway was represented by Christine Guldbrandsen in the Eurovision Song Contest 2006 with the song "Alvedansen". The song is written and composed by Christine Guldbrandsen, Kjetil Fluge and Atle Halstensen.

Before Eurovision

Melodi Grand Prix 2006 

Melodi Grand Prix 2006 was the Norwegian national final that selected Norway's entry for the Eurovision Song Contest 2006. Three semi-finals, one Last Chance round and a final were held between 13 January and 4 February 2006

Semi-finals and Last Chance round 

 The first semi-final took place on 13 January 2006 at the Finnmarkshallen in Alta. "Here for the Show" performed by Trine Rein and "Lost and Found" performed by Jorun Erdal and Geir Rønning qualified directly to the final, while "Misled" performed by Kirsti Carr and "Sunshine" performed by Arlene Wilkes advanced to the Last Chance round. "My Dream" performed by Christina Undhjem and "Tonight" performed by Mocci Ryen were eliminated from the contest.
 The second semi-final took place on 20 January 2006 at the Nordlandshallen in Bodø. "Absolutely Fabulous" performed by Queentastic and "I Hear Music" performed by Hans-Petter Moen and Kim Arne Hagen qualified directly to the final, while "The Better Side of Me" performed by Ovi Martin and "I Wanna Be" performed by Jannicke Abrahamsen advanced to the Second Chance round. "Heaven's in Your Eyes" performed by Hanne Haugsand and "Too Much Love" performed by Marit Strømøy were eliminated from the contest.
 The third semi-final took place on 27 January 2006 at the Framohallen in Bergen. "Alvedansen" performed by Christine Guldbrandsen and "Dreaming of a New Tomorrow" performed by Tor Endresen qualified directly to the final, while "Saturday" performed by Birgitte Einarsen and "Like A Wind" performed by Veronica Akselsen advanced to the Second Chance round. "Shut Up and Kiss Me" performed by Phung and "Paparazzi World" performed by Kathrine Strugstad were eliminated from the contest.
 The Last Chance round (Siste sjansen) took place on 3 February 2006 at the Spektrum in Oslo. "Saturday" performed by Birgitte Einarsen and "Like a Wind" performed by Veronica Akselsen qualified to the final.

Final 
Eight songs competed during the final on 4 February 2006 held at the Spektrum in Oslo. The winner was selected over two rounds of public televoting. In the first round, the top four entries were selected to proceed to the second round, the Gold Final: "I Hear Music" performed by Hans-Petter Moen and Kim Arne Hagen, "Absolutely Fabulous" performed by Queentastic, "Alvedansen" performed by Christine Guldbrandsen, and "Lost And Found" performed by Jorun Erdal and Geir Rønning. In the Gold Final, the results of the public televote were revealed by Norway's five regions and led to the victory of "Alvedansen" performed by Christine Guldbrandsen with 77,568 votes.

At Eurovision
Norway automatically qualified to the grand final, because it was on the top 11 last year. She performed fifth, following Latvia and preceding Spain and finished in 14th place with 36 points. As Norway failed to reach the top 10 in the final, the country was forced to compete in the semi-final of the 2007 contest.

Voting

Points awarded to Norway

Points awarded by Norway

References

External links
Full national final on nrk.no

2006
Countries in the Eurovision Song Contest 2006
Eurovision
Eurovision